Prince Pyotr Vasilyevich Lopukhin (1753, Saint Petersburg – 1827) was a Russian politician and member of the Lopukhin family. He was president of the Council of Ministers from 1816 to 1827.

Marriage and issue
He married twice: 
 Praskovia Ivanovna, née Levshina (1760—1785). Children:
 Princess Anna Petrovna Lopukhina (1777—1805), a royal mistress to Emperor Paul of Russia
 Vasily Petrovich (1780—?)
 Yekaterina Petrovna Lopukhina (Demidova) (11 April 1783 — 21 July 1830), wife of Grigory Alexandrovich Demidov
 Praskovya Petrovna Lopukhina (Kutaisova) (1784—1870), a lady-in-waiting, wife of Pavel Kutaisov
 Ekaterina, née Shetneva (1763–1839). Children:
 Alexandra Petrovna Lopukhina (1788—1852)
 Pavel Petrovich Lopukhin (1790—1873), a lieutenant general, a member of the Napoleonic Wars, Freemason
 Elizaveta Petrovna (179?—1805), died young
 Sofya Petrovna Lopukhina (Lobanova-Rostovskay) (1798—1825), wife of Aleksey Yakovlevich Lobanov-Rostovsky, died in childbirth

Life
Educated at home, he was recorded as Life Guards of the Transfiguration Regiment and entered service in 1769.

1753 births
1827 deaths
Politicians of the Russian Empire
Members of the State Council (Russian Empire)
Active Privy Councillors, 1st class (Russian Empire)
Pyotr
Imperial Moscow University alumni